Bis(fulvalene)diiron is the organoiron complex with the formula (C5H4-C5H4)2Fe2.  Structurally, the molecule consists of two ferrous centers sandwiched between fulvalene dianions.  The compound is an orange solid with lower solubility in benzene than ferrocene.  Its structure has been verified by X-ray crystallography.  The compound has attracted some interest for its redox properties.

Preparation
It was first prepared by Ullmann coupling of 1,1'-diiodoferrocene using copper but subsequent work produces the complex is 20-40% yield from dilithiofulvalene and ferrous chloride:
2(C5H4Li)2  +  2FeCl2  →  (C5H4-C5H4)2Fe2  +  4LiCl

Related compounds
 Biferrocene

References

Ferrocenes
Sandwich compounds
Cyclopentadienyl complexes